KKPM-CD (channel 28) is a low-power, Class A religious television station licensed to Yuba City, California, United States. Owned by One Ministries, Inc., it is sister to Fort Bragg-licensed Total Living Network partner station KQSL (channel 8), San Francisco-licensed low-power stations KQTA-LD (channel 15) and KMMC-LD (channel 24), Medford, Oregon-licensed low-power stations KDSO-LD (channel 16) and its translator KDOV-LD (channel 18), Redding-licensed KDRC-LD (channel 26) and Hopland-licensed Christian alternative rock radio station KORB (88.7 FM). KKPM-CD's transmitter is located on South Sutter Butte.

In addition to religious programs on its main channel, KKPM-CD broadcasts programming from California Music Channel, Blues TV Network, Daystar, and Heartland, and retransmits KQSL and San Francisco-based ethnic station KTSF.

Technical information

Subchannels
The station's digital channel is multiplexed:

Translators

Subchannels: San Francisco Bay Area
Translators in the San Francisco Bay Area Media market carry the following digital subchannels:

Translators

Subchannels: Monterey/Salinas
Translators in the Monterey/Salinas Media market carry the following digital subchannels:

Translators

References

External links
 

Low-power television stations in the United States
KPM-CD
Television channels and stations established in 1999
1999 establishments in California
Religious television stations in the United States
Daystar (TV network) affiliates
Heartland (TV network) affiliates